Imantodes tenuissimus, commonly known as the Yucatán blunthead snake, is a species of snake of the family Colubridae.

Geographic range
The snake is found in Mexico.

References 

Imantodes
Snakes of Central America
Reptiles of Mexico
Reptiles described in 1867
Taxa named by Edward Drinker Cope